Desyatiny is the name of several rural localities in Russia:
Desyatiny, Novgorod Oblast, a village in Borkovskoye Settlement of Novgorodsky District of Novgorod Oblast
Desyatiny, Tver Oblast, a village in Staritsky District of Tver Oblast